A referendum on a new constitution was held in Sierra Leone on August 1991. Voting was held over four days (23, 26, 28 and 30 August). The new constitution would restore multi-party politics, as the country had been a one-party state since the 1978 constitutional referendum made the All People's Congress the only legally permitted party.

Of the approximately 2.5 million voters, turnout was around 75%. The new constitution was approved by around 80% of voters, and came into force on 1 October. As a result, the 1978 constitution was repealed. Due to a coup eight months after the referendum, the first elections under the new constitution were not held until 1996.

References

Elections in Sierra Leone
1991 referendums
Referendums in Sierra Leone
Sierra Leone
1991 in Sierra Leone
Constitutional referendums
August 1991 events in Africa